Agostino Giuseppe Delfino O.F.M. Cap. (17 June 1935 – 18 October 2020) was an Italian-born Central African Republic Roman Catholic bishop.

Delfino was born in Italy and was ordained to the priesthood in 1959. He served as bishop of the Roman Catholic Diocese of Berbérati, Central African Republic from 1991 to 2010.

Notes

1935 births
2020 deaths
20th-century Roman Catholic bishops in the Central African Republic
Italian Roman Catholic bishops in Africa
Capuchin bishops
Roman Catholic bishops of Berbérati